Bab al-Nasr may refer to:

Bab al-Nasr (Aleppo), Syria
Bab al-Nasr (Cairo), Egypt